Kronprinzessin Cecilie was a Hamburg-America Line passenger ship launched on 14 October 1905 by Krupp Aktiengesellschaft Germaniawerft at Kiel, Germany.

The ship, after leaving New York on 25 July 1914 sought refuge in the port of Falmouth, Cornwall, Britain not yet having declared war, from a French cruiser. The ship was given permission to leave on Britain's entry into the war, though British and French warships were waiting, refused, and as a result was condemned in a British court, requisitioned by the government and taken into the Royal Navy as HMS Princess in 1915.

Construction and design
Kronprinzessin Cecilie was built for the Hamburg-America Line by Krupp Aktiengesellschaft Germaniawerft, Kiel, under a June 1904 contract in which the keel was laid on 1 January 1905 and the ship was launched on 14 October 1905.

The engines were in a central engine room without separation bulkheads with common starting and work platforms between and drove two manganese bronze four-bladed propellers, turning outboard going ahead, with  diameter and  pitch. Steam was provided by three double ended, with three furnaces at each end, and one single ended boiler with three furnaces at the front end for a total of twenty-one furnaces. Electrical power at 102 volts for lights and some auxiliary equipment, including radio, was generated by three dynamos, two aft in the engine room and one above the waterline forward of the main deck engine hatch, each delivering 400 amperes.

Commercial service
On 20 February 1906 the ship steamed from Kiel to Hamburg where she was delivered to Hamburg-America on 24 February and left on her maiden voyage on 14 March for Veracruz and Tampico, Mexico.

The ship having the same name as the larger Norddeutscher Lloyd ship resulted in occasional confusion as with reports of Kronprinzessin Cecilie being involved in transporting arms to Mexico for General Huerta and taking the Mexican delegation to the mediation conference even while the Norddeutscher Lloyd ship was arriving in New York with the New York Times noting: "the fact that there are two steamers named Kronprinzessin Cecilie has caused much confusion in the minds" of its readers.

The ship was reported to have aboard arms for General Huerta but did not land them at Veracruz and proceeded to Puerto, Mexico. The Mexican delegation of Emilio Rabasa, Augustin Rodriguez and Luis Eiguero departed Veracruz on 10 May 1914 aboard Kronprinzessin Cecilie for the mediation conference to be held at Niagara Falls, Ontario to resolve the dispute between Huerta and the United States.

Kronprinzessin Cecilie had been engaged in tourist service and transport of the Mexican delegation had departed New York on 25 July 1914. Under pursuit by a French cruiser she had put into Falmouth before Britain had declared war. At the close of the court proceedings the British government announced the ships had been requisitioned.

HMS Princess

Kronprinzessin Cecilie was taken into the Royal Navy and renamed to become HMS Princess in 1915 and converted to a dummy for the battleship , with superstructure and guns made of wood. The work was done in Belfast by Harland and Wolff. Princess/Ajax patrolled around Loch Ewe until October 1915, when she was decommissioned and converted to a proper armed merchant cruiser, with eight  guns. She recommissioned on 6 May 1916 and went to East Africa, where she served until October 1917, before being paid off in Bombay.

Her logbook for her entire service with the Royal Navy can be viewed at www.naval-history.net.

Footnotes

References

Bibliography

1905 ships
Ships built in Kiel
Steamships of Germany
Passenger ships of Germany
World War I merchant ships of Germany
Steamships of the United Kingdom
World War I Auxiliary cruisers of the Royal Navy